Krishnapur is a village and a gram panchayat within the jurisdiction of the Mandirbazar police station in  the Mandirbazar CD block in the Diamond Harbour subdivision of the South 24 Parganas district in the Indian state of West Bengal.

Geography

Area overview
Diamond Harbour subdivision is a rural subdivision with patches of urbanization. Only 14.61% of the population lives in the urban areas and an overwhelming 85.39% lives in the rural areas. In the eastern portion of the subdivision (shown in the map alongside) there are 24 census towns. The entire district is situated in the Ganges Delta and the eastern part of the district is a flat plain area with small towns, many in clusters. Location of places in the larger map varies a little. It is an OpenStreetMap, while we are using coordinates as in Google Maps.

Note: The map alongside presents some of the notable locations in the subdivision. All places marked in the map are linked in the larger full screen map.

Location
Krishnapur  is located at

Demographics
According to the 2011 Census of India, Krishnapur (K) had a total population of 3,594 of which 1,874 (52%) were males and 1,720 (48%) were females. There were 378 persons in the age range of 0–6 years. The total number of literates in Krishnapur was 2,508 (77.99% of the population over 6 years).

Transport
Krishnapur is on the State Highway 1.

Madhabpur railway station is located nearby.

Education
Raghunathpur High School is a Bengali-medium coeducation institution established in 1946. It has facilities for teaching from class VI to class XII.

Anchna High School is a Bengali-medium boys only institution established in 1947, It has facilities for teaching from class V to class XII.

Anchna Balika Bidyalaya is a Bengali-medium girls only institution established in 1966. It has facilities for teaching from class V to class X.

Healthcare
Naiyarat Rural Hospital at Krishnapur, with 30 beds, is the major government medical facility in the Mandirbazar CD block.

References

Villages in South 24 Parganas district